Save the Last Dance is a 2001 American teen dance film produced by MTV Films, directed by Thomas Carter and distributed by Paramount Pictures. The film stars Julia Stiles and Sean Patrick Thomas as a teenage interracial couple in Chicago who work together to help Stiles' character train for a Juilliard School dance audition.

Released theatrically in the United States on January 12, 2001, the film received mixed reviews from critics but was a box-office success and grossed $131.7 million worldwide against a $13 million budget.

A direct-to-video sequel, Save the Last Dance 2, was released in 2006.

Plot 
Seventeen-year-old Sara Johnson, a promising ballet dancer in suburban Chicago, hopes to be admitted to Juilliard School and implores her mother to attend the audition. She fails the audition and soon learns that her mother was killed in a car accident in her haste to get to it.

Sara is wracked with guilt and gives up ballet. She moves to the South Side to live with her estranged father Roy, a jazz musician who plays the trumpet at nightclubs. Sara also transfers to a majority-black high school, where she is one of a handful of white students, but quickly befriends Chenille Reynolds, a teenage single mother who is having relationship problems with her ex-boyfriend Kenny. Chenille invites Sara to a dance club called Stepps, where she has her first experience dancing to hip hop rhythms. At Stepps, Sara dances with Derek, Chenille's brother and a student with dreams of attending Georgetown University to become a pediatrician. Derek decides to help Sara develop her dancing skills by incorporating more hip hop into her style. He takes a reluctant Sara to the Joffrey Ballet and, afterwards, she confides in him about her mother and her dreams. Later, they return to the club and amaze others with their dancing. While performing, Derek's ex-girlfriend Nikki interrupts the two and begins dancing with Derek, making Sara retreat to the bar. Afterward, Derek returns to Sara and apologizes for pairing up with Nikki; they subsequently make up and return to Roy's apartment. Having achieved his dream of being accepted into Georgetown, Derek convinces Sara to follow her dreams of Juilliard; they eventually begin a romantic relationship.

At school, Nikki picks a fight with Sara. Later, Chenille tells Sara that she did not approve of the fight, but can understand the bitterness since Sara, a white girl, is stealing one of the decent black boys at school. Because of this conversation, Sara and Chenille's friendship becomes strained, and Sara decides to break up with Derek. Meanwhile, Derek deals with his friend Malakai, who is heavily involved in the gang lifestyle that Derek is trying to leave. Derek agrees to help Malakai execute a drive-by at the same time as Sara's audition. Roy has a heart-to-heart talk with Sara and encourages her to go through with the audition.

After learning what Chenille said to Sara, Derek confronts her about it, as well as explains his true reasons for dumping Nikki. Remorseful for her actions, Chenille admits that what she did was wrong and apologizes. She also tells Derek that Sara did not want to dump him, but Chenille's words hurt her to the point of feeling forced to. Chenille also admits that she has been resentful for how Kenny has been treating her, including not helping her raise their son and not being a good boyfriend to her. She unintentionally took it out on Sara since she has been jealous of her and Derek's relationship. Chenille encourages Derek to be with Sara, admitting that she knows that Sara is in love with him. She also warns Derek not to follow Malakai, knowing that he may lose his chance to attend Georgetown and his future if he is arrested. Derek decides to bail on Malakai to attend Sara's audition, arriving at a crucial point in her performance to offer her encouragement and moral support. Afterward, Sara is accepted into Juilliard and she rekindles her relationship with Derek. Meanwhile, the drive-by is botched and Malakai is arrested. The film closes as Sara, Derek, Chenille, and their friends meet at Stepps to celebrate Sara's successful audition.

Cast 
Julia Stiles as Sara Johnson
Sean Patrick Thomas as Derek Reynolds
Kerry Washington as Chenille Reynolds
Fredro Starr as Malakai
Terry Kinney as Roy Johnson
Bianca Lawson as Nikki
Elizabeth Oas as Diggy
Vince Green as Snookie
Garland Whitt as Kenny

Production 
Julia Stiles landed the role as Sara when director Thomas Carter saw her dance scene in the 1999 film 10 Things I Hate About You. To prepare for her role, Stiles did two months of training for the ballet scenes while also rehearsing the choreography for the hip hop scenes. Fatima Robinson was the film's hip hop choreographer.

Music

Soundtrack 

The film's soundtrack was released on December 19, 2000, through Hollywood Records and consisted of hip hop and R&B music. The soundtrack was a huge success, and made it to several Billboard charts. It peaked at 3 on the Billboard 200, 2 on the Top R&B/Hip-Hop Albums, 6 on the Top Soundtracks, 3 on the Top Internet Albums and 2 on the Canadian Albums Chart, and featured two charting singles "Crazy" and "You". Save the Last Dance went both gold and platinum on January 29, 2001, and was certified 2x multi-platinum on May 20, 2002.  The soundtrack won the American Music Award for Best Soundtrack in 2002.

Allmusic rated the soundtrack three out of five stars. RapReviews rated it three and a half out of ten.

 "Shining Through" (Theme from Save the Last Dance) – Fredro Starr & Jill Scott
 "You" – Lucy Pearl feat. Snoop Dogg & Q-Tip
 "Bonafide" – X-2-C
 "Crazy" – K-Ci & JoJo
 "You Make Me Sick" – Pink
 "U Know What's Up" – Donell Jones
 "Move It Slow" – Kevon Edmonds
 "Murder She Wrote" – Chaka Demus & Pliers
 "You Can Do It" – Ice Cube feat. Mack 10 & Ms. Toi
 "My Window" – Soulbone
 "Only You" – 112 feat. The Notorious B.I.G.
 "Get It On Tonite" – Montell Jordan
 "All or Nothing" – Athena Cage
 "Shining Through" (Theme from Save the Last Dance) [Soulshock & Karlin Bonus Track] – Fredro Starr & Jill Scott
 "What You Want" – Mase

Release
The film debuted at number 1 at the North American box office making $27.5 million in its opening weekend. Though the film had a 44% decline in earnings the following weekend, it was still enough to keep the film at the top spot for another week. It grossed $91,057,006 in the US alone and $131.7 million worldwide.

Home media
The film was released on DVD and VHS on June 19, 2001. It was re-released on DVD on January 24, 2017.

Reception

Positive reviews praised the performances of Stiles, Thomas, and Washington. Desson Howe of The Washington Post called Stiles and Washington appealing performers and concluded, "Thomas is the movie's best element. He puts so much authority in his performance, he makes this controversial romance seem like the best thing that could happen to anyone. That's no easy task."

In a three-star review, Roger Ebert said that despite the film's clichéd story and romance, "the development is intelligent, the characters are more complicated than we expect, and the ending doesn't tie everything up in a predictable way." Charles Taylor of Salon wrote, "for all its dumb clichés it offers the basic appeal of teen movies: the pleasure of watching kids be kids, acting as they do among themselves instead of how parents and teachers expect them to act."

Writing for the Chicago Tribune, Mark Caro wrote, "On paper the movie is full of cliches recently explored elsewhere...Yet in this case the outline is not the story; the people who inhabit it are," and in this way, "Save the Last Dance triumphantly passes the audition." 

Negative reviews criticized the editing style of dance scenes, the film's "after-school special"-like subplot, and the script for not delving enough into the issues of interracial relationships. Critic Wesley Morris wrote "the movie combines the worst of urbansploitation with the worst of teensploitation, and outfits them both in makings of the ultimate racial-crossover melodrama -- teen motherhood, deadbeat teen dads, drive-bys, a dangerous ex-girlfriend, speeches straight from the pages of Terry McMillan." Lisa Schwarzbaum of Entertainment Weekly wrote, "director Thomas Carter is afraid to pump up the volume on its own interracial, hip hop Romeo and Juliet story, lest it challenge even one sedated viewer or disturb the peace."

Awards and nominations

Sequel 
A sequel to the film, titled Save the Last Dance 2, was released direct-to-video on October 10, 2006.

See also 
 Dirty Dancing, a 1987 film which starred Patrick Swayze, a performer from the Joffrey Ballet
 Step Up, a 2006 film starring Channing Tatum, Jenna Dewan, and Mario
Dance Flick, a 2009 spoof film which starred Damon Wayans, Jr., and Shoshana Bush

References

External links 

 
 
 
 
 

2001 films
2000s musical films
2000s teen romance films
2000s teen drama films
American dance films
American musical drama films
American romantic drama films
American romantic musical films
American teen drama films
American teen romance films
2000s English-language films
Films set in Chicago
Films shot in Chicago
2000s hip hop films
Films about interracial romance
Films about race and ethnicity
Paramount Pictures films
MTV Films films
Films scored by Mark Isham
2001 drama films
Films directed by Thomas Carter (director)
2000s American films